Karasura Glacier is the  long and  wide glacier on the northeast side of Bastien Range in Ellsworth Mountains, Antarctica.  It drains the north slopes of Bergison Peak and the east slopes of Patmos Peak, flows northwards, leaves the range and enters the southeast flowing Nimitz Glacier.

The glacier is named after the ancient Roman and medieval settlement of Karasura in Southern Bulgaria.

Location
US mapping in 1961 and 1988.

See also
 List of glaciers in the Antarctic
 Glaciology

Maps
 Vinson Massif.  Scale 1:250 000 topographic map.  Reston, Virginia: US Geological Survey, 1988.
 Antarctic Digital Database (ADD). Scale 1:250000 topographic map of Antarctica. Scientific Committee on Antarctic Research (SCAR). Since 1993, regularly updated.

References
 Karasura Glacier SCAR Composite Gazetteer of Antarctica
 Bulgarian Antarctic Gazetteer. Antarctic Place-names Commission. (details in Bulgarian, basic data in English)

External links
 Karasura Glacier. Copernix satellite image

Glaciers of Ellsworth Land
Bulgaria and the Antarctic